Juliane Schenk (born 26 November 1982) is a German badminton player. In March 2014 she retired from international play.

Career 
In 2001, she won the European Junior Championships in women's singles. 2003 saw her win the women's doubles with Nicole Grether in two tournaments, the Irish International and the Bitburger Open.

Schenk played badminton at the 2004 Summer Olympics, losing in women's singles to Tracey Hallam of Great Britain in the round of 32. She also won the German championship in the women's doubles with Grether for the first time.

She also competed in women's doubles with partner Grether. They defeated Michelle Edwards and Chantal Botts of South Africa in the first round but were defeated by Ann-Lou Jørgensen and Rikke Olsen of Denmark in the round of 16.

She won the bronze medal at the 2008 European Badminton Championships.

In 2008, Schenk competed in the Beijing Olympics. She narrowly lost her first round match against Indonesian Maria Kristin Yulianti who later won the bronze medal.

Schenk nearly reached a bronze medal in the World Championship in Hyderabad in women's singles but lost to French Pi Hongyan in the final set, 19:21. It would have been another medal for German women after the shared bronze medals of Xu Huaiwen and Petra Overzier in 2006.

In 2010 European Badminton Championships, Schenk beat 1st seed Pi Hongyan to proceed to the final. She settled for silver after losing to Tine Rasmussen in three sets. In 2012 European Badminton Championships, she lost to Baun again in the final.  At the 2012 Summer Olympics, she reached the last 16, being beaten by Ratchanok Intanon.

Schenk became an independent professional player in June, having severed ties with the German Badminton Association (DBV). Despite being left in the lurch, Schenk showed great determination to reach the Indonesian Open final in June. She did that with just one training session. In the first inaugural edition of the Indian Badminton League, held from 14 August 2013 to 31 August, Schenk joined Pune Pistons with a reported salary of $90,000.

Schenk also signed a contract with the Xiamen Tefang Badminton Club to compete in the 2013–2014 China Badminton Super League. She was beaten by Sun Yu from Guangzhou Huizhou Weihao 11–8 and 11–5, and later at the end of the year she was beaten by Wang Yihan 12–10, 6–11, 11–6.

In early 2014 in the China Badminton Super League, Schenk was beaten by Wang Shixian representing Jiangsu, 11–5, 11–5. Schenk had announced on her website earlier in the year that she was intent on getting out of the top ten so that she could avoid paying fines for missing Superseries Premier events.  She retired the first round in 2014 Malaysia Super Series Premier against Minatsu Mitani and had a walkover to Beiwen Zhang in 2014 All England Super Series Premier. She told the Rheinische Post that she would be working as a personal trainer, that she was studying at the University of Cologne, and that she was writing a book.

At the end of April, she lost to Liu Xin in China Badminton League.

Achievements

BWF World Championships 
Women's singles

European Championships 
Women's singles

Women's doubles

European Junior Championships 
Girls' singles

Girls' doubles

BWF Superseries 
The BWF Superseries, which was launched on 14 December 2006 and implemented in 2007, was a series of elite badminton tournaments, sanctioned by the Badminton World Federation (BWF). BWF Superseries levels were Superseries and Superseries Premier. A season of Superseries consisted of twelve tournaments around the world that had been introduced since 2011. Successful players were invited to the Superseries Finals, which were held at the end of each year.

Women's singles

  Superseries tournament
  Superseries Premier tournament
  Superseries Finals tournament

BWF Grand Prix 
The BWF Grand Prix had two levels, the Grand Prix and Grand Prix Gold. It was a series of badminton tournaments sanctioned by the Badminton World Federation (BWF) and played between 2007 and 2017. The World Badminton Grand Prix was sanctioned by the International Badminton Federation from 1983 to 2006.

Women's singles

Women's doubles

 BWF Grand Prix Gold tournament
 BWF & IBF Grand Prix tournament

BWF International Challenge/Series 
Women's singles

Women's doubles

  BWF International Challenge tournament
  BWF International Series tournament

Record against selected opponents 
Record against year-end Finals finalists, World Championships semi-finalists, and Olympic quarter-finalists.

References

External links 
 Pictures of Juliane Schenk at Badmintonfotos.de

1982 births
Living people
Sportspeople from Krefeld
German female badminton players
Badminton players at the 2004 Summer Olympics
Badminton players at the 2008 Summer Olympics
Badminton players at the 2012 Summer Olympics
Olympic badminton players of Germany